Tun Abdullah bin Ahmad Badawi (Jawi: عبد الله بن احمد بدوي; born 26 November 1939) is a Malaysian retired politician who served as the 5th Prime Minister of Malaysia from October 2003 to April 2009. He was also the sixth president of the United Malays National Organisation (UMNO), the largest political party (that time) in Malaysia, and led the governing Barisan Nasional (BN) parliamentary coalition. He is informally known as Pak Lah, Pak meaning 'Uncle', while Lah is taken from his name 'Abdullah'.

He was also a Member of Parliament (MP) for Kepala Batas for eight consecutive terms, that was from 1978 to 2013. Currently, he serves as the Chancellor of Universiti Teknologi Petronas (UTP).

Background, early life and education 
Abdullah was born in Bayan Lepas, Penang to a prominent religious family. Badawi's paternal grandfather, Syeikh Abdullah Badawi Fahim, was of Hadrami descent. Syeikh Abdullah was a well-respected religious leader and nationalist, was one of the founding members of Hizbul Muslimin, later known as PAS. After independence, Syeikh Abdullah became the first mufti of Penang after Independence. His father, Ahmad Badawi, was a prominent religious figure and UMNO member. His mother, Kailan Haji Hassan died in Kuala Lumpur at the age of 80 on 2 February 2004. His maternal grandfather, Ha Su-chiang (also known as Hassan Salleh), was an Utsul Muslim who came from Sanya in Hainan.

Abdullah is a former student of Bukit Mertajam High School. He studied at MBS (Methodist Boys' School) Penang for his 6th form. Abdullah obtained a Bachelor of Arts degree in Islamic Studies from the University of Malaya in 1964.

Political career
After graduating from the University of Malaya, he joined the Malaysian Administrative and Diplomatic Corps (the formal term for civil service). He served as Director of Youth at the Ministry of Youth and Sport as well as Secretary of the National Operations Council (MAGERAN). He resigned in 1978 to become a member of parliament for his constituency of Kepala Batas in northern Seberang Perai (which had also been represented by his father).

Early during Mahathir's tenure as prime minister, a bitter dispute erupted within the ruling UMNO party and it was divided into two camps, which were colloquially known as 'Team A', comprising Mahathir loyalists, and 'Team B', which supported former Minister of Finance Tengku Razaleigh Hamzah and former Deputy Prime Minister Musa Hitam. Mahathir prevailed, leading to the exclusion of Tengku Razaleigh Hamzah from the newly established UMNO (Baru) or New UMNO. Abdullah was a close supporter of his political mentor Musa Hitam in Team B and as a result, he was sacked from his post of Minister of Defence in the Cabinet. He did not join the Semangat 46 (Spirit 46) party which was set up by Tengku Razaleigh Hamzah. Semangat 46 is now defunct.

When UMNO (Baru) was formed in February 1988, Mahathir, the UMNO President and Prime Minister, brought Abdullah into the pro tem committee of UMNO (Baru) as the vice-president. In 1990, Abdullah retained his seat as vice president. During the Cabinet reshuffle in 1991, Mahathir brought him back into the Cabinet as Foreign Minister. He held this post until November 1999, when Syed Hamid Albar succeeded him. Even though he lost his vice presidency in the 1993 UMNO elections, he remained in the Cabinet and was appointed Minister of Foreign Affairs. Prior to 1998, he also served as Minister in the Prime Minister's Department, Minister of Education, Minister of Defence, and Minister of Foreign Affairs.  He completed his probation when he was appointed Deputy Prime Minister of Malaysia and Minister of Home Affairs following the dismissal of Anwar Ibrahim. After Deputy Prime Minister Anwar Ibrahim was dismissed, Prime Minister Mahathir Mohamad appointed Abdullah as Deputy Prime Minister in 1999. Abdullah went on to succeed Mahathir as Prime Minister in 2003.

Prime Minister

First term 
Upon coming into power as prime minister, Abdullah Badawi promised to clamp down on corruption, thus empowering anti-corruption agencies and providing more avenues for the public to expose corrupt practices. He advocated an interpretation of Islam known as Islam Hadhari, which advocates the intercompatibility between Islam and economic and technological development. His administration emphasised a revival of the Malaysian agricultural sector.

In the 2004 general election, Abdullah scored a significant victory. In the 11th General Election, Abdullah Badawi's first as Prime Minister of Malaysia, he delivered a landslide victory for his party's coalition Barisan Nasional (of which UMNO is the dominant party) by winning 198 out of 220 seats in parliament and wresting control of the Terengganu state government from the Islamist opposition Pan-Malaysian Islamic Party (PAS), as well as coming close to capturing the traditional PAS stronghold of Kelantan. The victory was widely regarded as an approval of his vision of moderate Islam over religious fundamentalism as well as support for his anti-corruption policies.

Former Deputy Prime Minister Anwar Ibrahim, upon his release from prison in September 2004, publicly credited Abdullah Badawi for not interfering with the court's overturning of his sodomy conviction.

On 10 September 2004, Abdullah Badawi became Finance Minister and presented his maiden budget, which was seen by many as maintenance-oriented as opposed to the growth policies emphasised by Mahathir Mohamad. He also focused on Malaysia's internal security after the increase in corrupt practices, such as bribery, in law enforcement in Malaysia.

Abdullah Badawi was heavily involved in foreign policy-making. He was the chairman of the Organisation of the Islamic Conference since the start of his premiership in 2003.

As of 2005, Abdullah Badawi was the chairman of the ASEAN, and he also served as chairman of the Non-Aligned Movement (NAM) from October 2003 until September 2006.

Economic policies 
Abdullah Badawi declared an end to the economic legacy and grandiose projects of his predecessor, Mahathir Mohamad, during the 57th UMNO General Assembly. He told delegates that he would not pursue the economic strategies adopted two decades ago by Mahathir.

He said that in the past, wealth was generated not by innovation and creativity, but by foreign investment, government contracts, and privatisation.

Agriculture and biotechnology are some of the highlighted issues in 9MP that the government believes such sectors are still able to generate wealth for many Malaysians, especially those in rural areas.

In late 2005, Badawi successfully led Malaysia into a historic free trade agreement with Japan enabling the two countries to scrap tariffs on essentially all industrial goods and most agricultural, forestry and fishery products within a decade.

Under the Abdullah Badawi administration, the country is moving down to a value-chain economy by developing its inherent strengths in agriculture without losing its existing manufacturing base. However, Abdullah has been criticised for his handling of the sudden hikes in the price of petrol and electricity through the restructuring of government subsidies, especially as it is detrimental to Malaysia's position as a traditional exporter.

50 years of nationhood 
On 31 August 2007, Abdullah Badawi shouted 'Merdeka!' during the midnight celebrations of Malaysia's 50 years of nationhood. The celebrations were held at Merdeka Square, Kuala Lumpur, where thousands of people had congregated. This was a symbolic gesture which emulated the actions of Malaya's first prime minister, the late Tunku Abdul Rahman when the latter declared independence from the British in 1957.

Second term 
Abdullah Badawi won a second term as prime minister by winning the 2008 general election, held in March 2008, with a reduced majority. In the 12th General Election, Barisan Nasional won a slim majority of seats but lost its two-thirds majority and also lost 5 states to Opposition Pact. He also lost four additional states to the opposition (Kedah, Penang, Perak and Selangor). Although his party, Barisan Nasional, suffered a major setback, Abdullah Badawi vowed to fulfill the promises in his manifesto amid calls from Mahathir, the opposition and even among UMNO members for him to resign. However, his deputy, Najib Razak, and others in his party voiced unreserved support for his leadership. It took a while before open dissent started brewing at grassroots levels, with petition and campaigns being launched to ask for his resignation.

He was sworn in for a second term as prime minister on 10 March 2008. Badawi unveiled a streamlined 68-member Cabinet on 18 March 2008, dropping half the ministers in his previous administration and keeping the crucial finance portfolio for himself.

Abdullah faced a political crisis not only from the onslaught of the Opposition which gained much ground by taking the richest and most important states (Selangor and Penang, which incidentally is the hometown of Abdullah Badawi). He also faced growing discontent from within his own ranks in the UMNO party. Mukhriz Mahathir, the son of the former prime minister Mahathir Mohamad, openly called for him to step down. The UMNO Youth chief, Hishammuddin Hussein, did not take any action against Mukhriz and dismissed it as a personal opinion.

Regarding the live telecast in Dewan Rakyat (the first time since after the 12th General Election), Abdullah said he was ashamed at what had transpired in the Dewan Rakyat on 30 April 2008 (Wednesday) and agreed that live telecast of the proceedings should be scrapped. He said what happened was just "too much."

"I felt ashamed if people watched television and saw what was happening in our Dewan. In my heart, I also felt that all this happened because there was a live broadcast at that time," said the Prime Minister.

There were many ideas from the government MPs and opposition MPs. Some MPs suggested that the live telecast should not be scrapped to let the people know what was really happening in the Dewan Rakyat and judge the MPs in conducting the people's voice in the parliament. The live telecast of the proceedings is to be continued to show that there is transparency and to let the people know how the MPs are behaving and debating.

On 19 May 2008, the dispute between Mahathir and Abdullah reached a "shocking" stage when Dr Mahathir, who had served as UMNO President for 22 years, announced that he was quitting the party after having lost confidence in Abdullah Badawi's leadership, and that he would only rejoin the party after Abdullah had stepped down as UMNO President and Prime Minister.

On 15 September 2008, Abdullah's cabinet Minister in Prime Minister Department Senator Datuk Zaid Ibrahim submitted his resignation letter to the Prime Minister. He tendered his resignation as a protest to the government's action in detaining a blogger, a member of parliament and a reporter under the Internal Security Act. Abdullah later accepted his resignation.

Retirement and transfer of power
Abdullah was under heavy pressure to step down after many within his UMNO party including former Prime Minister Dr Mahathir Mohamad openly asked him to take full responsibility for the dismal performance during the 12th General Election in March 2008. On 10 July 2008, Abdullah announced he would step down as UMNO President and Prime Minister in mid-2009. He stepped down in favour of his successor, Najib Razak, during the UMNO General Assembly held on 1 April 2009. Nevertheless, shortly before he resigned, Najib gave promises to Abdullah that his constituency in Kepala Batas would continue to receive development funds, where he would continue to serve as its MP.

Abdullah Badawi handed his resignation letter to the Yang di-Pertuan Agong on 2 April 2009. On 3 April 2009, he was succeeded by Najib Razak as prime minister. The Deputy Prime Minister, Najib, was sworn in as the new Prime Minister the following day. Abdullah was then conferred with a "Tun" title by King Mizan Zainal Abidin for his service to the nation.

Controversies and issues

Anti-Corruption 
Abdullah Badawi's administration has been criticised for failing to assert its anti-corruption credentials. After moves to charge prominent figures such as Eric Chia and the then Land and Co-operative Development Minister, Kasitah Gaddam, with corruption, Abdullah Badawi's administration's efforts to combat corruption allegedly became less transparent. It was noted by the Economist that little progress has been made on curbing corruption.

Malaysia as an Islamic State 
In 2007 Prime Minister Abdullah Ahmad Badawi first called Malaysia an Islamic state. Earlier that month he had made another statement, saying Malaysia was neither a theocratic or secular state. A similar statement was made by Prime Minister on 12 March 2009, where he stated Malaysia was a "negara Islam". The Malaysian Chinese Association (MCA), a political group representing Malaysian Chinese, expressed reservations over this announcement. The MCA's position is that Malaysia is a fully secular state, and that the law transcends religion.

Iraq Oil-for-Food scandal 
Abdullah Ahmad Badawi has been criticised for endorsing his relatives who were involved in abuses related to the Iraqi Oil-for-Food Programme.

Nuclear proliferation 

Abdullah Ahmad Badawi has been criticised after one of his son's companies was found to be producing components for centrifuges purported to be intended for use in Libya's secret uranium enrichment program.

Concerns and disputes by Mahathir Mohamad and UMNO 
In 2005, it was alleged that under Abdullah Badawi's administration, there had been a significant increase in cases of cronyism regarding the distribution of import permits for foreign-manufactured vehicles. Former Prime Minister Mahathir had called for an investigation of the issue. Later, Mahathir Mohamad criticised Abdullah for cancelling a number of development projects that the former had started, such as the construction of a bridge to replace the causeway linking Malaysia and Singapore.

Vote of no confidence to Abdullah Badawi in Parliament 
On 18 June 2008, the Sabah Progressive Party, a member of the 14-party ruling Barisan Nasional coalition, said its two legislators in the federal parliament will move or back a motion of no-confidence against Abdullah.

Malaysia has never experienced a serious no-confidence vote before and it is unclear what is the next step if, in the unlikely event, Abdullah loses the vote; whether a snap election is held, or whether the King dissolves parliament, or whether a new leader is given the opportunity to form a new government. No Malaysian Prime Minister has ever faced a vote of no-confidence presented by a member of his own coalition before. The Barisan Nasional has 140 lawmakers in the 222-member Parliament, enough to defeat any vote against Abdullah who is also president of the UMNO.

Nevertheless, the motion was rejected by the Speaker on the basis that there were no grounds for the motion to be put forward.

Personal life 

On 20 October 2005, Abdullah Badawi's wife, Endon Mahmood, died of breast cancer. Endon discovered the disease in 2003 while her twin sister Noraini, who had earlier been diagnosed with the same illness, died in January 2003. She received treatment in the United States and returned to Malaysia 18 days before her death. She is buried at a Muslim cemetery, at Taman Selatan, Precinct 20, Putrajaya.

On 6 June 2007, the Prime Minister's office announced Abdullah Badawi's marriage to Jeanne Abdullah. On 9 June, a private ceremony was conducted at the Prime Minister's residence, Seri Perdana, and attended by close relatives. Jeanne was formerly married to the younger brother of Abdullah Badawi's late wife. She was also a manager at the Seri Perdana residential complex and has two children from her previous marriage.

Abdullah Ahmad Badawi has been criticised for allowing his son-in-law, Khairy Jamaluddin, to become unduly influential in UMNO politics.

Abdullah Ahmad Badawi has been criticised for allowing his brother Fahim Ibrahim Badawi to buy 51 percent of the government-controlled MAS Catering Sdn Bhd. Fahim later sold this stake to Lufthansa's LSG Skychef at a huge profit.

Abdullah Ahmad Badawi is known also as a poet. His poem I Seek Eternal Peace was translated into more than 80 languages and published as a book.

In September 2022, Abdullah Badawi was reported to be suffering from dementia and requires the use of a wheelchair, according to Khairy.

Election results

Honours and awards

Honours of Malaysia
  :
  Member of the Order of the Defender of the Realm (AMN) (1971)
  Officer of the Order of the Defender of the Realm (KMN) (1975)
  Grand Commander of the Order of the Defender of the Realm (SMN) – Tun (2009)
  :
  Grand Knight of the Order of the Territorial Crown (SUMW) – Datuk Seri Utama (2010)
  :
  Grand Commander of the Royal Family Order of Johor (DK I) (2004)
  : 
  Recipient of the Royal Family Order of Kelantan or Star of Yunus (DK) (2006)
  :
  Recipient of the Kedah Supreme Order of Merit (DUK) (2006)
  :
  Knight Grand Commander of the Premier and Exalted Order of Malacca (DUNM) – Datuk Seri Utama (2004)
  :
  Knight Grand Commander of the Order of Loyalty to Negeri Sembilan (SPNS) – Dato' Seri Utama (2000)
  :
  Grand Knight of the Order of Sultan Ahmad Shah of Pahang (SSAP) – Dato' Sri (1999)
  Member 2nd class of the Family Order of the Crown of Indra of Pahang (DK II) (2006)
  :
  Member of the Order of Defender of the State (DJN) (1979)
  Companion of the Order of Defender of the State (DMPN) – Dato' (1981)
  Commander of the Order of Defender of the State (DGPN) – Dato' Seri (1997)
  Knight Grand Commander of the Order of Defender of the State (DUPN) – Dato' Seri Utama (2004)
  :
  Ordinary Class of the Perak Family Order of Sultan Azlan Shah (SPSA) – Dato' Seri DiRaja (2003)
  :
  Knight Grand Companion of the Order of the Gallant Prince Syed Sirajuddin Jamalullail (SSSJ) – Dato' Seri Diraja (2001)
  :
  Grand Commander of the Order of Kinabalu (SPDK) – Datuk Seri Panglima (1999)
  :
  Knight Grand Commander of the Order of the Star of Hornbill Sarawak (DP) – Datuk Patinggi (2003)
  :
  Knight Companion of the Order of Sultan Salahuddin Abdul Aziz Shah (DSSA) – Dato' (1992)
  Knight Grand Commander of the Order of the Crown of Selangor (SPMS) – Dato' Seri (2000)
  :
  Supreme Class of the Order of Sultan Mizan Zainal Abidin of Terengganu (SUMZ) – Dato' Seri Utama (2005)

International honours
  :
  Family Order of Brunei 1st Class (DK) – Dato Laila Utama (2010)
  :
  Grand Cross of the Order of Merit (1994)
  :
  Order of José Marti (2004)
  :
  2nd Class of the Star of the Republic of Indonesia (2007)
  :
  Grand Cordon of the Order of the Sacred Treasure (1991)
  :
  First Class of the Order of Friendship (1997)
  :
  Gwangha Medal of the Order of Diplomatic Service Merit (1983)
  :
  Knight Grand Cross of the Order of the White Elephant (GCE) (1994)

Places named after him
Several places were named after him, including:
 Kolej Tun Abdullah Ahmad Badawi, a residential college at Universiti Malaysia Perlis, Simpang Empat, Perlis

References

Further reading
Bridget Welsh & James Chin (ed) Awakenings: The Abdullah Badawi Years in Malaysia (KL: SIRD 2013)

External links 

 Official Website of the Government of Malaysia
 Profile: Abdullah Ahmad Badawi, BBC News, 8 October 2008
 The loyal Abdullah wins his rival Anwar's job
 thesundaily.com, Full statement from PM Abdullah Ahmad Badawi
 Video of discussion with Abdullah Ahmad Badawi at the Asia Society, New York 10/19/2009
 

|-

|-

|-

|-

|-

|-

|-

|-

|-

|-

|-

1939 births
Living people
People from Penang
Malaysian people of Malay descent
Malaysian people of Chinese descent
Malaysian people of Yemeni descent
Malaysian Muslims
Presidents of United Malays National Organisation
Prime Ministers of Malaysia
Deputy Prime Ministers of Malaysia
Foreign ministers of Malaysia
Defence ministers of Malaysia
Education ministers of Malaysia
Finance ministers of Malaysia
Home ministers of Malaysia
Government ministers of Malaysia
Members of the Dewan Rakyat
University of Malaya alumni
Secretaries-General of the Non-Aligned Movement
Members of the Order of the Defender of the Realm
Officers of the Order of the Defender of the Realm
Grand Commanders of the Order of the Defender of the Realm
Knights Grand Commander of the Order of the Star of Hornbill Sarawak
First Classes of the Royal Family Order of Johor
Knights Grand Commander of the Order of the Crown of Selangor
Second Classes of the Family Order of the Crown of Indra of Pahang
Recipients of the Kedah Supreme Order of Merit
20th-century Malaysian politicians
21st-century Malaysian politicians